Tomáš Nemčík (born 19 April 2001) is a Slovak professional footballer who currently plays for Fortuna Liga club MŠK Žilina as a defender.

Club career

MŠK Žilina
Nemčík made his Fortuna Liga debut for Žilina during an away fixture against Ružomberok on 21 October 2020. He appeared in the starting-XI and completed the entirety of the match. While Žilina was one up after the first half after a goal by Dawid Kurminowski, Šošoni conceded twice in the last ten minutes following strikes by Matej Kochan and Martin Regáli, losing the game 1:2.

In March 2022, Nemčík had extended his contract with Žilina until the summer of 2024.

International career
Nemčík was first recognised in Slovak senior national team nomination in November 2022 by Francesco Calzona being listed as an alternate for two friendly fixtures against Montenegro and Marek Hamšík's retirement game against Chile. Few weeks later, in December, he was nominated for prospective players' training camp at NTC Senec.

References

External links
 MŠK Žilina official club profile 
 
 Futbalnet profile 
 

2001 births
Living people
Sportspeople from Žilina
Slovak footballers
Slovakia youth international footballers
Slovakia under-21 international footballers
Association football defenders
MŠK Žilina players
2. Liga (Slovakia) players
Slovak Super Liga players